Justine M. Cassell (born March 19, 1960) is an American professor and researcher interested in human-human conversation, human-computer interaction, and storytelling. Since August 2010 she has been on the faculty of the Carnegie Mellon Human Computer Interaction Institute (HCII) and the Language Technologies Institute, with courtesy appointments in Psychology, and the Center for Neural Bases of Cognition.

Early life and education
Justine Cassell was born in New York City and attended Brooklyn's Saint Ann's School. She holds a DEUG in Lettres Modernes from the Université de Besançon (1981), a BA in Comparative Literature/Linguistics from Dartmouth College (1982), an M.LITT. in Linguistics from the University of Edinburgh (1986), and a double PhD in Linguistics and Developmental/Cognitive Psychology from the University of Chicago (1991) where she studied under David McNeill.

Career
As a tenured professor, Cassell was the director of the Gesture and Narrative Language Research Group at the MIT Media Lab. After leaving MIT, she became a full professor in the departments of Electrical Engineering and Computer Science, and Communication Studies at Northwestern University. There she was the founding director of Technology and Social Behavior Ph.D. program, and the interdisciplinary Center for Technology and Social Behavior. In 2001, Cassell received the Edgerton Faculty Award at MIT; in 2008 she received the Anita Borg Institute Women of Vision Award for Leadership; in 2009 Cassell was made an ACM Distinguished Lecturer. Cassell has authored more than 100 journal articles, conference proceedings and book chapters on these topics; she has given more than 50 keynote addresses at various conferences. In March 2016 she was elected a Corresponding Fellow of the Royal Society of Edinburgh, in recognition of her contributions to computer science and to human-computer interaction.

Cassell's early work involved verbal and nonverbal aspects of human communication, into which she began introducing computational systems in order to deconstruct the linguistic and nonverbal communication to allow machines to interact with humans.  Randal Bryant, Dean of Carnegie Mellon's School of Computer Science, commented on her appointment to the directorship of the Human Computer Interaction Institute that she would "expand the horizons of the institute." The Institute studies how people communicate with and through technology.

Cassell has done work on "animated conversation," designing a human figure animation that integrates gesture, intonation, and facial expression.  She helped design a web-based storytelling system called "Renga, the Cyberstory" to help draw girls into new technology. During 1994-1995 she designed and coordinated workshops on survival skills for women in academia at the University of Pennsylvania and the Linguistic Society of America Summer Institute in Linguistics. She also has worked on research into what constitutes a "normal" career path in linguistics for women.

A New York Times reviewer described the book From Barbie to Mortal Kombat: Gender and Computer Games (written with Henry Jenkins) as an "academic anthology about what women, or rather girls, want from computer games." He writes that they "wisely" ask "why there have to be 'girl games' at all. After all, many games with tremendous appeal to women have no gender affiliation." She has commented frequently in media on topics related to girls and children and toys and technology.

Cassell has opined that "The Internet is not diminishing community activity, but simply transferring it to online communities. Young people who use them are getting just as much practice in leadership and social skills and community involvement as they did before the Internet."

Commenting on why women were not more involved in computing careers, Cassell has commented that the creation of girls' games had not eliminated "the sense among both boys and girls that computers were 'boys' toys' and that true girls didn't play with computers." Additionally, she has written that women do not want to be identified as a "nerd" or "geek."

Cassell is credited with developing the Embodied Conversational Agent (ECA), a virtual human which can interact with humans using language and gestures. The "virtual child" she created has helped children with autism develop advanced social skills not taught by association with real children or teachers.

Cassell contributed to a 2011 New York Times debate on "Where Are the Women in Wikipedia?" writing: "...Wikipedia may feel like a fight to get one's voice heard. One gets a sense of this insider view from looking at the 'talk page' of many articles, which rather than seeming like collaborations around the construction of knowledge, are full of descriptions of 'edit-warring' — where successive editors try to cancel each other's contributions out — and bitter, contentious arguments about the accuracy of conflicting points of view...However, it is still the case in American society that debate, contention, and vigorous defense of one's position is often still seen as a male stance, and women's use of these speech styles can call forth negative evaluations."

In 2017, she became a Fellow of the Association for Computing Machinery.

Affiliations
Justine Cassell is affiliated with the following organizations:
 Association for Computing Machinery
 Association for Computational Linguistics
 Linguistic Society of America
 Society for Research in Child Development

Bibliography
Gesture and the dynamic dimension of language: essays in honor of David McNeill, with David McNeill, Susan D. Duncan, Elena Terry Levy, John Benjamins Publishing Company, 2007
Embodied Conversational Agents, MIT Press, 2000. First book ever published describing embodied conversational agents. 
From Barbie to Mortal Kombat: Gender and Computer Games, MIT Press, 1998.

See also
 Embodied conversational agent

References

External links

 Justine Cassell's home page
 Carnegie Mellon's Human-Computer Interaction Institute
 Cassell's ArticuLab, part of Carnegie Mellon University's Human Computer Interaction Institute
 MIT's Gesture and Narrative Language Group

1960 births
Living people
Linguists from the United States
Scientists from New York City
Artificial intelligence researchers
Alumni of the University of Edinburgh
Women linguists
Dartmouth College alumni
University of Chicago alumni
Fellows of the Association for Computing Machinery
Center for Advanced Study in the Behavioral Sciences fellows
Saint Ann's School (Brooklyn) alumni